Robert Douglas Houghton (born 30 October 1947) is an English football manager and former player. His career has spanned over 30 years and 10 countries. He is most famous for taking Swedish club Malmö FF to the 1979 European Cup Final, where they lost to Nottingham Forest.

Career

Early career
During his brief playing career, Houghton was a midfielder for Fulham (1966–69) and Brighton & Hove Albion (1969–70). Houghton was one of the youngest coaches ever to manage in English senior football, being appointed player-manager of Hastings United in the Southern League at only 23. During that period, he was a star pupil of coaching guru Allen Wade, who was the technical director of the Football Association between 1963 and 83. In the early 1970s Houghton also managed Maidstone United and worked as an assistant to Bobby Robson at Ipswich Town.

Malmö FF
He became the manager of Swedish top flight side Malmö FF in 1974. Houghton guided them to success domestically and internationally, reaching the 1979 European Cup Final, losing 1–0 against Nottingham Forest. The team was all based on local players who came from within 60 km from Malmö. It was the first and so far only time a Swedish team has reached the European Cup final.

He also won the Swedish championship and Svenska Cupen several times and was runner-up in the Intercontinental Cup in 1979 (Nottingham Forest had declined to participate), the Swedish team lost against Olimpia from Paraguay (Libertadores Cup Champion 1979).

Revolution in Sweden
Houghton's early coaching career was closely linked to that of his friend Roy Hodgson. They worked together at Maidstone, Stranraer and Bristol City. They also managed different teams in Swedish football at the same time.

Houghton moved to Sweden with Malmö in 1974 and two years later installed Hodgson at Halmstad. The pair are credited with transforming football in Sweden and bringing in zonal marking for the first time to Swedish football. Swedish teams at the time used a sweeper with 3 or 5 in defence favouring man-marking. The two were known in Sweden as English Roy and English Bob.

Besides zonal marking, the defence pressed hard and maintained a high offside line. Their teams counter-attacked with long passes played in behind the opposition defence. Instead of playing with a team that was very spread out from one end of the field to the other, with a libero who stayed in his penalty area and a centre-forward who never tracked back, they set up a system of zonal defence, a back four, people pushing up and getting the ball forward into the final area much more quickly.

1980s and '90s
After a short spell in Greece with Ethnikos Piraeus, Houghton returned to his homeland in 1980 to manage Bristol City. His spell at Ashton Gate Stadium was unsuccessful as the financially stricken club were relegated and Houghton resigned after a defeat to Wimbledon. Houghton's next job was with North American Soccer League side Toronto Blizzard between 1982 and 1984. He then managed in Saudi Arabia with Al-Ittihad before returning to Sweden at Örgryte IS and Malmö FF again. After another spell with Al-Ittihad in 1993, he joined Swiss side FC Zürich in April 1994 and remained in charge for just over a year before leaving in March 1995. In 1996, he became the first ever coach of Major League Soccer side Colorado Rapids before being sacked after just one season.

International management

China
Houghton then assumed control of the Chinese national team in late 1997, who had just failed to qualify for the 1998 World Cup. Within weeks, Houghton was able to memorise the names of all his players, a rare feat in foreign coaches, and helped build the team's confidence and self-belief. China were placed second in the Dynasty Cup very shortly after Houghton took over, and he developed a reputation for being able to implement an effective technical football program for struggling teams. They also attained a bronze medal at the 1998 Asian Games. After failing to qualify for the 2000 Olympic football tournament, Houghton left as manager of the Chinese national team in 1999. He later had several spells as a club manager in China and was also a coaching instructor.

Uzbekistan
He had a spell in charge of Uzbekistan in 2005 when he was charged with qualifying for the 2006 World Cup though his attempt failed after losing a controversial play-off tie against Bahrain. Uzbekistan won the first match 1–0 but FIFA declared the result void after a refereeing mistake, and Uzbekistan were eliminated on the away goals rule.

India
After coaching Chinese side Changsha Ginde for a few months, Houghton was then appointed head coach of India in June 2006 by the All India Football Federation. His appointment saw a general progress in India's performances crowned by victory in the Nehru Cup in August 2007. The following year India suffered a huge loss when Maldives defeated them at the final of SAFF Championship 2008, despite a 100% record in the group stage, including a victory over the Maldives. However, Houghton led India to the AFC Challenge Cup title as they beat Tajikistan 4–1 in August 2008, which gave India a berth at the Asian cup 2011 in Doha. 
He also oversaw the Indian team to its second consecutive Nehru Cup trophy win in 2009. He resigned in 2010 after not being able to reach a new contract deal. 
He later confirmed that his contract had been renewed until 2013, but hinted that he might review his decision after the 2011 Asian Cup. 
At the Asian Cup, India, the lowest-ranked team in the tournament, lost all of their three group matches as predicted. Despite this, India's football authorities expressed disappointment over the national team's performance and the All India Football Federation (AIFF) technical committee urged the executive committee to sack Houghton.
On 23 April 2011, Bob Houghton tendered his immediate resignation as the India national team coach, which the AIFF accepted. Houghton's last assignment as Indian coach was the AFC Challenge Cup 2012 qualifiers in Malaysia, where India topped Group B which included Pakistan, Chinese Taipei and Turkmenistan.

Honours

Manager

Malmö FF
Allsvenskan: 1974, 1975, 1977
Svenska Cupen: 1973–74, 1974–75, 1977–78, 1979–80

India
 AFC Challenge Cup: 2008
 SAFF Championship runner-up: 2008
 Nehru Cup: 2007, 2009

Al-Ittihad
Saudi Federation Cup: 1987

References

External links
FC Zürich stats

1949 births
Living people
English footballers
Fulham F.C. players
Brighton & Hove Albion F.C. players
Hastings United F.C. (1948) players
Hastings United F.C. (1948) managers
English football managers
English expatriate football managers
Malmö FF managers
Bristol City F.C. managers
Toronto Blizzard managers
Ethnikos Piraeus F.C. managers
Örgryte IS managers
North American Soccer League (1968–1984) coaches
Colorado Rapids coaches
China national football team managers
India national football team managers
Uzbekistan national football team managers
FC Zürich managers
Expatriate football managers in Greece
Expatriate football managers in Saudi Arabia
Expatriate football managers in Sweden
Guangzhou City F.C. managers
2011 AFC Asian Cup managers
Maidstone United F.C. (1897) players
Ittihad FC managers
Expatriate football managers in China
Major League Soccer coaches
Association football midfielders
English expatriate sportspeople in China
English expatriate sportspeople in Sweden
English expatriate sportspeople in Saudi Arabia
English expatriate sportspeople in the Czech Republic
English expatriate sportspeople in Greece
English expatriate sportspeople in India
English expatriate sportspeople in Uzbekistan
English expatriate sportspeople in the United States
English expatriate sportspeople in Canada